PCB Bank is an American community bank that focuses on the Korean-American community based in California and offers commercial banking services. It has branches in 8 states and is the third largest Korean American Bank after Bank of Hope and Hanmi Bank.

History
The bank was founded as a state-chartered bank on September 18, 2003, in Los Angeles, California. On July 9, 2007, Pacific City Financial Corporation was established and became a bank holding company with Pacific City Bank become a wholly owned subsidiary. Daniel Cho was appointed to Pacific City Bank’s board of directors on April 1, 2017. Henry Kim was appointed to succeed Haeyoung Cho, a founding member of the bank, as president and chief executive officer of the company and the bank upon her retirement at the end of 2017.

Overview
PCB Bank currently operates 12 branch offices and 8 loan production offices in Lynwood and Bellevue, Washington; Denver, Colorado, Chicago, Illinois; Annandale, Virginia; Atlanta, Georgia; Orange County, California; and Bayside, New York for small to medium-size businesses and offers real estate loans, small business loans and lines of credit, trade finance loans, auto loans, residential mortgage loans, and SBA loans.

References

External links
 Official website

Companies listed on the Nasdaq
Banks established in 2003
Banks based in California
Companies based in Los Angeles
Korean-American culture in Los Angeles
Korean American banks